The following is a list of ice skating rinks in Southeast Asia.

Indonesia

Malaysia

Philippines

Former venues

Singapore

References

Ice rinks in Southeast Asia
Ice rinks